Argyrotaenia juglandana, the hickory leafroller moth, is a species of moth of the family Tortricidae. It is found in North America, where it has been recorded from Alabama, Arkansas, Florida, Illinois, Indiana, Kentucky, Louisiana, Maryland, Mississippi, Missouri, New Hampshire, New York, North Carolina, Ohio, Ontario, Pennsylvania, Quebec, Tennessee, Texas, West Virginia and Wisconsin. The habitat consists of deciduous woodlands and parks where hickory grows.

The wingspan is about 18–20 mm. The ground colour of the forewings is brown with two darker brown diagonal lines and a pale spot at the base. The hindwings are pale grey to dirty white. Adults have been recorded on wing from April to August.

The larvae feed on the leaves of Corylus species, Viburnum species (including Viburnum acerifolium), Carya species (including Carya cordiformis, Carya ovata), Juglans species (including Juglans nigra) and Prunus species.

References

juglandana
Moths of North America
Moths described in 1879